Burns Park was a baseball park located in Detroit, Michigan that served three seasons as the exclusive Sunday home of the Detroit Tigers baseball club in the American League from 1900 through 1902.

Burns Park was built in response to blue laws, which prevented Sunday games from being played at Bennett Park, the team's primary baseball park. The park was named for the Tigers' then-owner, James D. Burns, who built the ballpark on his own property. 

Sources are in some conflict about the exact location of the ballpark. Some have placed it on a triangular block between Livernois Avenue, Vernor Highway, and railroad tracks. However, contemporary sources place it at "south of the stock yards, at the corner of Waterman and Dix Avenues" [Detroit Free Press, April 25, 1900, p.8]; and Polk's 1901 Detroit City Directory states "southwest corner Toledo and Waterman Avenues." Toledo was later renamed Vernor Highway, and Dix Street merges into Vernor Highway at the Waterman intersection. Marc Okkonen, in his book Minor League Baseball Towns of Michigan (Dickinson Press, 1997) also places the ballpark at the southwest corner of Waterman and Vernor. One source described the location as "near the stockyards in Springwells Township, just past the Detroit city line." Being outside the city limits was key to being able to play Sunday ball there. 

The April 25, 1900, newspaper report stated that park was to have covered seating for 1,200 and open bleachers for about another 2,300. The only known references to the park are text; no photographs or diagrams of the park are known to exist.

The American League of 1900 was a minor league, previously called the Western League. The first game at the park was held on May 6, 1900, with the Tigers losing to the Indianapolis Hoosiers 11-5.[Detroit Free Press, May 7, 1900, p.8]

The American League declared itself a major league in 1901 and broke relations with the National League. On April 28, 1901, the first major league game was played at the ballpark in which the Tigers defeated the Milwaukee Brewers 12-11. 

With peace between the leagues for 1903, the Tigers were advised to abandon Burns Park as being in an unsavory part of town, by which time Burns had sold the club anyway, so Burns Park ceased being a host to professional baseball.

The Tigers wrapped up their usage of Burns Park on September 7, 1902, with an 11-6 win over the Baltimore Orioles. In subsequent years they played a handful of Sunday "home" games in other cities, until finally securing permission to play Sunday ball at Bennett Park in August of 1907.

External links
 Burns Park at RetroSheet.org
 Burns Park game log at RetroSheet.org
 Detroit Tigers past venues

Defunct Major League Baseball venues
Detroit Tigers stadiums
Sports venues in Detroit
1901 establishments in Michigan